Matic Maruško (born 30 November 1990) is a Slovenian football midfielder who plays for Mura.

Career statistics

Honours
Mura
Slovenian PrvaLiga: 2020–21
Slovenian Second League: 2017–18
Slovenian Cup: 2019–20

References

External links
NZS profile 

1990 births
Living people
People from Murska Sobota
Slovenian footballers
Slovenia under-21 international footballers
Association football midfielders
Slovenian Second League players
Slovenian PrvaLiga players
Slovak Super Liga players
2. Liga (Slovakia) players
Kazakhstan Premier League players
ND Mura 05 players
NK Nafta Lendava players
FC Spartak Trnava players
FC Kaisar players
FC Akzhayik players
NŠ Mura players
Slovenian expatriate footballers
Slovenian expatriate sportspeople in Slovakia
Expatriate footballers in Slovakia
Expatriate footballers in Kazakhstan
Slovenian expatriate sportspeople in Austria
Expatriate footballers in Austria